North Carolina's 89th House district is one of 120 districts in the North Carolina House of Representatives. It has been represented by Republican Mitchell Setzer since 2003.

Geography
Since 2023, the district has included parts of Catawba and Iredell counties.. The district overlaps with the 37th and 45th Senate districts.

District officeholders

Multi-member district

Single-member district

Election results

2022

2020

2018

2016

2014

2012

2010

2008

2006

2004

2002

2000

References

North Carolina House districts
Catawba County, North Carolina
Iredell County, North Carolina